Nseke Hydroelectric Power Station is an operational hydropower plant in the Democratic Republic of the Congo, with installed capacity of . It is operated by the Congolese electricity utility company, Société Nationale d'Électricité (SNEL).

Location
The power station is located on the Lualaba River, in Lualaba Province, in southeastern DR Congo, close to the border with Zambia. The geographical coordinates of Nseke Hydroelectric Power Station are: 10°18'15.0"S, 25°24'24.0"E (Latitude:-10.304167;
Longitude:25.406667).

Overview
This power station was constructed in the 1950s and commercially commissioned in 1956. The power plant comprises four General Electric turbines, each with generating capacity of 65 megawatts. The power produced is integrated into the national electric grid, by the national electricity utility, SNEL.

Due to the age of the hardware, there have been efforts to refurbish and modernize hardware and operations at the power station, in order to maintain functional efficiency.

Ownership
Nseke Power Station was constructed in the 1950s and commercially commissioned in 1956 to supply power to Générale des carrières et des mines (Gécamines) a DR Congo mining conglomerate, which owns mines in Lualaba Province and in the adjacent Haut-Katanga Province. In 1974, SNEL, the electricity generation, transmission and distribution monopoly took over ownership of the power station, following a presidential decree.

See also

References

External links
Democratic Republic of Congo and GE sign energy infrastructure agreement As of 13 February 2020. 

Hydroelectric power stations in the Democratic Republic of the Congo
 Energy infrastructure completed in 1956
Lualaba Province
Hydroelectricity in the Democratic Republic of the Congo
Dams in the Democratic Republic of the Congo